Lengwe National Park is a national park in Malawi located near the town of Chikwawa and about 40 miles southwest of Blantyre. Lengwe's topography is unusual for Malawi and consists of open deciduous forests and dense thickets. It is the home of the reclusive Nyala antelope.

The climate of Lengwe is hot and dry, and the only source of consistent water is from the rain.  Many man-made water holes have been constructed to attract and maintain the animal population. Jambo Africa Ltd operates Nyala Lodge for visitors.

Animals that inhabit this park are the giraffe, spotted hyena, leopard, warthog, kudu, impala, Samango monkey, reedbuck, Cape buffalo and suni. Interesting birds, particularly shrikes, rollers, bee-eaters and the Yellow-spotted nicator.

History
In 1928, Lengwe was established as a Game Reserve to protect the large mammals found in the Lower Shire Valley, especially the nyala antelope and its habitat.  This protection is important as the Lower Shire Valley is the farthest north where nyala can be found naturally.
At that time, the protected area measured 520 square kilometers.  Later, it was reduced to 120 square kilometers in order to provide land for agriculture.  This 120-km2 is what is now referred to “Old Lengwe.”  This did not contain the year-round water supply to the animals that the Shire had provided, 964 and 1970, four artificial waterholes were built throughout the area, and in 1970, Lengwe was given national park status.

In 1975, the extension area was added, increasing the size to 887 square kilometers.  Lengwe was expanded mainly to protect the catchment areas of the Shire, Mwanza, and Nkombedzi wa Fodya rivers.  The extension also has the effect of protecting beautiful rock outcrops in the area and increasing the dispersal area for wildlife.

The Park is managed by the Department of National Parks and Wildlife (DNPW.

National parks of Malawi
Protected areas established in 1970
Geography of Southern Region, Malawi
Zambezian and mopane woodlands
Important Bird Areas of Malawi